The Matthes Glaciers are a group of glaciers east of the Glacier Divide in the Sierra Nevada, in the U.S. state of California. The glaciers were named for François E. Matthes. There are approximately 10 small glacierets situated above  in the John Muir Wilderness of Sierra National Forest which comprise the Matthes Glaciers.

See also
List of glaciers in the United States

References

Glaciers of California
Glaciers of the Sierra Nevada (United States)
Glaciers of Fresno County, California